Navasky Anderson (born 21 January 2000) is a Jamaican middle-distance runner. He represented Jamaica in the 800m at the 2022 World Athletics Championships and finished fifth at the 2022 Commonwealth Games. He is the Jamaican national record holder over 800 metres both indoors and outdoors.

Early life
Born in Kingston, Jamaica, Anderson attended St. Jago High School and Essex County College before starting at Mississippi State University in 2020.

Career

2022
Anderson ran 1:45.02 at the NCAA Championships final at Hayward Field to break the Jamaican national record over 800 metres and finish runner-up to Moad Zahafi. He was subsequently called up to represent his country at the 2022 World Athletics Championships held in Eugene, Oregon. He finished seventh in his semi-final at the Championships.

Anderson made his first senior final at the 2022 Commonwealth Games final held in Birmingham, England. He finished fifth in the final running 1:48.75.

2023
Anderson lowered the Jamaican 800m indoor record in February 2023 at the Music City Challenge at Vanderbilt University in Nashville, Tennessee, running a time of 1:46.58.

References

2000 births
Living people
Jamaican male athletes
Mississippi State Bulldogs athletes
World Athletics Championships athletes for Jamaica
21st-century Jamaican people